Illich-Avia was a Ukrainian airline part of the Open Joint Stock Company (JSC) of Illich Iron and Steel Works of Mariupol and was founded in 2002. It was based at Mariupol International Airport and operated domestic and international flights, most of them on behalf of its parent Illich Steel & Iron Works.

History 
Illich-Avia Avia was launched in 2002. It held operator certificate No. 198 issued by the State Aviation Administration of Ukraine on 1 June 2005, Air Carrier License No. 118481 of 4 March 2005. The airline was unique as it is one of the few operators of the Antonov An-140. Illich-Avia meanwhile ceased operations.

Destinations 
Ilyich-Avia served the following destinations:

Greece 
Athens - (Athens International Airport) 
Thessaloniki - (Thessaloniki International Airport) 
Russia
Moscow - (Vnukovo Airport)
Ukraine
Kyiv - (Kyiv International Airport)
Kryvyi Rih - Kryvyi Rih International Airport
Mariupol - (Mariupol International Airport) base

Fleet

The Illich-Avia fleet included the following aircraft (as of August 2011):

References

External links

Official Website

Defunct airlines of Ukraine
Airlines established in 2002
Ukrainian companies established in 2002